Spun Gold is the 13th solo studio album by American country artist Barbara Mandrell. The album was released in July 1983 on MCA Records and was produced by Tom Collins. Spun Gold produced two major hit singles on the Billboard Country Singles chart in 1983.

Background and content 
Spun Gold was recorded in February 1983 in Nashville, Tennessee and contained ten tracks of new recordings. The album mainly consisted of country pop-influenced material mixed with song themes that discuss the hardships of working-class people. It included a duet with country artist Steve Wariner entitled "Overnight Sensation". Allmusic reviewer Greg Adams compared background guitar on the track "In Times Like These" to the guitar "riff" on Ike & Tina Turner's single, "Proud Mary". He also considered the single, "One of a Kind Pair of Fools" to have a "strong hook and pure pop production". Overall, Adams only gave the release two out five stars, calling the material "disco-era glitz". Adams also found the album's cover to be displeasing saying, "Meanwhile, Mandrell is decked out on the album cover like a high-fashion model in gold lame'. Dolly Parton has always been able to negotiate these kinds of apparent contradictions, but Mandrell does not have the same gift."

Spun Gold was issued on an LP album in its original release, with five songs on each side of the record.

Release 
Spun Gold spawned two singles in 1983. The lead single from the album was the opening track "In Times Like These". The song was released to radio in March 1983 and reached a peak of number 4 on the Billboard Magazine Hot Country Songs chart and number 6 on the RPM Canadian Country chart. The second single "One of a Kind (A Pair of Fools)" was released in July 1983 and became Mandrell's final number 1 single on the Billboard Country Singles Chart and also reached the same position on the Canadian RPM Country Tracks chart. Spun Gold was also released in 1983 and peaked at number 5 on the Billboard Top Country Albums chart and number 140 on the Billboard 200 albums chart.

Track listing 
Side one
"In Times Like These" (Kye Fleming, Dennis Morgan) – 2:58
"As Well As Can Be Expected" (Fleming, Morgan) – 3:23
"One of a Kind Pair of Fools" (R. C. Bannon, John Bettis) – 2:48
"Only Now and Then" (Don Pfrimmer, Mike Reid) – 3:22
"You Are No Angel" (Roberto Danova, Grant Blair) – 2:57

Side two
"A Man's Not a Man ('Til He's Loved by a Woman)" (Steve Dean, Frank J. Myers) – 3:15
"Overnight Sensation" (Jerry Fuller) – 3:16
with Steve Wariner
"Loveless" (Fleming, Morgan) – 3:07
"Bad Boys" (Diane Warren) – 2:54
"Cryin' All the Way to the Bank" (Fleming, Morgan) – 3:35

Personnel
From Spun Gold album jacket.

Musicians
Pete Bordonali – electric guitar, mandolin, sitar
David Briggs – piano, Rhodes piano
Larry Byrom – electric guitar
Jimmy Capps – rhythm guitar
Tom Collins – organ
Sonny Garrish – steel guitar
David Hungate – bass guitar
Michael Jones – steel guitar
Shane Keister – synthesizer
Mike Leech – bass guitar
Randy McCormick – organ
Dennis Morgan – rhythm guitar
Nashville String Machine – strings
Bobby Ogdin – piano, Rhodes piano, synthesizer
Larry Paxton – bass guitar
James Stroud – drums
Reggie Young – electric guitar

Background vocals
Steve Brantley
Robert Byrne
The Cherry Sisters (Sherry Huffman, Lisa Silver, and Diane Tidwell)
Pat Childs
Bruce Dees
Jim Ferguson
Greg Gordin
Larry Keith
Mary Ann Lomax

Technical
Tom Collins – producer
Tim Farmer – engineer
Archie Jordan – string arrangement
Les Ladd – engineer
Barbara Mandrell – producer
Denny Purcell – mastering
D. Bergen White – string arrangement

Charts

Weekly charts

Singles

References 

1983 albums
Barbara Mandrell albums
MCA Records albums
Albums produced by Tom Collins (record producer)